The University of Dhaka (Bengali: ঢাকা বিশ্ববিদ্যালয়) (also known as Dhaka University, or  DU) is a public research university located in Dhaka, Bangladesh. It is the oldest university in Bangladesh. The university opened its doors to students on July 1st 1921. Currently it is the largest public research university in Bangladesh, with a student body of 46,150 and a faculty of 1,992. 

Nawab Bahadur Sir Khwaja Salimullah, who played a pioneering role in establishing the university in Dhaka, donated 600 acres of land from his estate for this purpose.

It has made significant contributions to the modern history of Bangladesh. After the Partition of India, it became the focal point of progressive and democratic movements in Pakistan. Its students and teachers played a central role in the rise of Bengali nationalism and the independence of Bangladesh in 1971.

Notable alumni include Muhammad Yunus (winner 2006 Nobel Peace Prize, pioneer of microcredit), Natyaguru Nurul Momen (pioneer literature, theatre & cultural doyen; who was both an early student and teacher of DU), Serajul Islam Choudhury (the country's leading public intellectual and writer), Mohammad Ataul Karim (physicist), Abul Fateh (one of the founding fathers of South Asian diplomacy), Buddhadeb Bose (20th-century Bengali poet), Lotay Tshering (prime minister of Bhutan) and Sheikh Mujibur Rahman (the founding father of Bangladesh but he never got any degree from DU).

History 

Before Dhaka University was established, near its grounds were the former buildings of Dhaka College affiliated to the University of Calcutta. In 1873 the college was relocated to Bahadur Shah Park. Later it shifted to Curzon Hall, which would become the first institute of the university.

The establishment of the university was compensation for the annulment of the 1905 Partition of Bengal. The partition had established the Muslim majority Eastern Bengal and Assam as a separate province, with Dhaka as its capital. All India Muslim League, newly formed in Dhaka, wholeheartedly supported the move.

However, the partition was abolished in 1911 due to severe opposition from Indian National Congress and Bengali Hindus. Deeply hurt by the decision of annulment of Bengal partition, a Muslim delegation led by Nawab Sir Khwaja Salimullah Bahadur, the then Nawab of Dhaka demanded a university be set up in Dhaka. To appease the majority Muslim masses of East Bengal, Lord Curzon agreed and declared that a university as a center of excellence would be established in Dhaka. Nawab Sir Salimullah, who played a pioneering role in establishing the university in Dhaka, donated 600 acres of land from his estate for this purpose.

In 1913, public opinion was invented before the university scheme was given its final shape. The secretary of state approved it in December 1913. The first vice-chancellor of the university, Philip Joseph Hartog, formerly academic registrar of the University of London for 17 years was appointed.

Established in 1921 under the Dacca University Act 1920 of the Indian Legislative Council, it is modelled after British universities. Lord Ronaldshay, Governor of Bengal between 1917 and 1922, was its first chancellor. He designated Nawaab Syed Shamsul Huda a life member of the university. On Huda's recommendation, Lord Ronaldshay appointed Ahmad Fazlur Rahman as a provost.

Academic activities started on 1 July in 1921 with 847 students along with 3 faculties: Arts, Science and Law; 12 departments: Sanskrit and Bengali, English, Education, History, Arabic and Islamic Studies, Persian and Urdu, Philosophy, Economics and Politics, Physics, Chemistry, Mathematics, and Law; and 3 dormitories for students: Salimullah Muslim Hall, Dacca Hall and Jagannath Hall.

In 1936, the university awarded honorary doctorate degrees to Jagadish Chandra Bose, Jadunath Sarkar, Sarat Chandra Chattopadhyay, Allama Iqbal and Rabindranath Tagore.

The university played a significant role in the Bengali Language Movement, when Bengalis joined to fight against Urdu being the official language in East Pakistan.

Dhaka University was the main place where the movement started with the students joining and protesting against the Pakistan Government. Later several students were killed where the Shaheed Minar stands today. After the incident, Bengali was restored as the official language.

The Dacca University Order, 1973 
President's Order No. 11 of 1973 re-constitute and reorganize the University of Dhaka to improve the teaching and research provided thereby and the administration after 1971 Independence war. Throughout this order, the word Dhaka was substituted for the word Dacca by section 2 of the University Laws (Amendment) Act, 1987 (Act No. XXXVI of 1987).

Campus

Residential facilities
There are 23 residence halls for the students and dormitories for the teachers as well as for the officials of the university.

Libraries

The University Library, housed in three separate buildings, is the biggest in Bangladesh. The library holds a collection of more than 617,000 volumes, including bound volumes of periodicals. In addition, it has a collection of over 30,000 manuscripts in other languages and a large number of microfilms, microfiche, and CDs. It subscribes to over 300 foreign journals.

The Dhaka University Library comprises three buildings: The administrative building, the main library building, and the science library building. The administrative building has administrative offices, a book acquisition section, a book processing section, a reprographic section, a bookbinding section, a manuscript section, and a seminar section.

Besides the Faculty of Business Studies of the university has an E-Library which is the largest in the Asia of its kind. This advanced level E-Library is connected with 35 internationally renowned libraries and publication houses in the world. Teachers, students, and researchers can read all journals, books research papers, and articles of these leading libraries, including the Dhaka University, Oxford University, and Cambridge University libraries, by using the E-Library facilities.

This e-library was built in collaboration with Robi Axiata Limited in August 2015. It can accommodate around 1400 students altogether. The 12,000 square feet library has three sections: a computer section, a silent zone, and a discussion zone. Some 7,000 students and 208 teachers of the faculty are being directly benefited from the facility.

Health services
The Medical Center of the University of Dhaka, near the Science Annex Building, offers free medical services and free pathological examinations to students, teachers, and staff and also family members of the teachers and staff. The center provides service round the clock, seven days a week, with 30 doctors working in shifts. The center has a dental unit, an eye unit, an X-ray department, and two ambulances.

Cafeteria
There are cafeterias on campus, some of which hold historical and architectural interests. In 1971 Pakistani soldiers killed the owner of the Madhur Canteen.

The Teacher-Student Centre, University of Dhaka of the university has its cafeteria while another cafeteria stands on the Dhaka University Snacks (DUS) chattar. Another one, the Science cafeteria was situated behind Curzon Hall, but currently, it has been broken down to construct a new 20-story building. There is also another snacks and lunch place named DU hut in front of the Department of Sociology. The Faculty of Business Studies has a modern food court for its students.

Faculties
The university consists of 13 Faculties and 83 Departments.

1.Faculty of Arts

 Department of Bangla
 Department of English
 Department of Persian Language and Literature
 Department of Philosophy
 Department of Psychology
 Department of Educational and Counselling Psychology
 Department of History
 Department of Arabic
 Department of Islamic Studies
 Department of Islamic History and Culture
 Department of Sanskrit and Hinduism
 Department of Information Science and Library management
 Department of Theater and Performance Studies
 Department of World Religions and Culture
 Department of Pali and Buddhist Studies
 Department of Urdu.
 Department of Linguistics
 Department of Music
 Department of Dance

2.Faculty of Business Studies

The Faculty of Business Studies (FBS) was established in 1970 as a Faculty of Commerce. It started the journey with two departments- the Department of Accounting and the Department of Management. Two more departments were created in 1974 and the authority introduced the semester system from the 1977–1978 session. The names of B.Com and M.Com degrees were changed to BBA and MBA respectively during the 1994–95 sessions. Following its re-branding as Faculty of Business Studies, four other departments were added to this Faculty over the course of next thirteen years.  In 1995, the faculty of commerce took its current name and became Faculty of Business Studies.

Muhammad Abdul Moyeen became the acting dean of the Faculty of Business Studies in May 2020.

Currently, there are nearly 153 teachers, 10 officers, 58 employees, and nearly 6100 students under the faculty and the departments are as follows.
 Department of Management Studies
 Department of Accounting & Information Systems
 Department of Marketing
 Department of Finance
 Department of Banking and Insurance
 Department of Management Information Systems
 Department of International Business
 Department of Tourism and Hospitality Management
 Department of Organization Strategy & Leadership

3.Faculty of Biological Sciences
 Department of Soil, Water and Environment
 Department of Botany 
 Department of Zoology
 Department of Biochemistry and Molecular Biology
 Department of Psychology
 Department of Microbiology
 Department of Fisheries
 Department of Medical Psychology
 Department of Genetic Engineering and Biotechnology
 Department of Educational Psychology

4.Faculty of Engineering and Technology
 Department of Electrical and Electronic Engineering
 Department of Applied Chemistry and Chemical Engineering
 Department of Computer Science & Engineering
 Department of Nuclear Engineering
 Department of Robotics and Mechatronics Engineering

5.Faculty of Fine Arts
 Department of Ceramics
 Department of Craft
 Department of Drawing and Painting
 Department of Graphic Design
 Department of Oriental Art
 Department of Printmaking
 Department of Sculpture
 Department of History of Art

6.Faculty of Law
 Department of Law

7.Faculty of Pharmacy
 Department of Pharmaceutical Chemistry
 Department of Clinical Pharmacy and Pharmacology
 Department of Pharmaceutical Technology
 Department of Pharmacy

8.Faculty of Science
 Department of Physics
 Department of Mathematics
 Department of Chemistry
 Department of Biomedical Physics and Technology
 Department of Theoretical Physics
 Department of Applied Mathematics
 Department of Statistics
 Department of Theoretical and Computational Chemistry

9.Faculty of Social Sciences
 Department of Economics
 Department of Political Science
 Department of International Relations
 Department of Anthropology
 Department of Public Administration
 Department of Mass Communication and Journalism
 Department of Communication Disorders
 Department of Printing and Publication Studies
 Department of Television Film and Photography
 Department of Sociology
 Department of Development Studies
 Department of Criminology
 Department of Japanese Studies
 Department of Women and Gender Studies
 Department Of Peace and Conflict Studies

10.Faculty of Earth and Environmental Sciences
 Department of Geography and Environment
 Department of Geology
 Department of Oceanography
 Department of Disaster Science and Management
 Department of Meteorology

11.Faculty of Medicine

12.Faculty of Education
 Department of Mechanical Engineering

13.Faculty of Postgraduate Medical Sciences and Research

 Department of Virology

Institutes

 Institute of Education and Research
 Institute of Statistical Research and Training
 Institute of Business Administration
 Institute of Social Welfare and Research
 Institute of Modern Languages
 Institute of Information Technology
 Institute of Renewable Energy
 Institute of Disaster Management and Vulnerability Studies
 Institute of Health Economics
 Institute of Leather Engineering and Technology
 National Institute of Traumatology and Orthopaedic Rehabilitation

Research centers 

 Bureau of Economic Research
 Bureau of Business Research
 Bose Center for Advanced Study and Research in Natural Sciences
 Renewable Energy Research Centre
 Delta Research Centre

Residential halls and hostels 
 Jagannath Hall
 Salimullah Muslim Hall
 Shahidullah Hall (Dhaka Hall)
 Fazlul Haq (Muslim) Hall
 Zahurul Haq Hall
 Ruqayyah Hall
 Masterda Surja Sen Hall
 Sir P. J Hartog (International Hostel) International Hall
 Haji Muhammad Mohsin Hall
 Shamsun Nahar Hall
 Kabi Jasimuddin Hall
 Sir A. F Rahman Hall
 Bangabandhu Sheikh Mujibur Rahman Hall
 Muktijoddha Ziaur Rahman Hall
 Bangladesh-Kuwait Maitree Hall
 Amar Ekushey Hall
 Begum Fazilatun Nesa Mujib Hall
 Kabi Sufia Kamal Hall
 Bijoy Ekattor Hall

Student life

The university of Dhaka organizes sports and other extracurricular and recreational activities. Office of the director of physical education provides three types of programs:
 Compulsory Physical Education,
 Certificate course in coaching major games and sports, and
 Intramural and extramural programs.

University of Dhaka ground is the official stadium of the University of Dhaka. It hosts many inter-collegiate sports tournaments at inter-city and national levels.

Intramural and extramural program
Directorate organizes and conducts inter-departmental and inter-hall tournaments, individual hall athletics, Dhaka university athletics, and inter-university games and sports. Students participate in national championships in games and sports for which prior training and coaching are offered.

Dhaka University Central Students' Union 
Dhaka University Central Students' Union is the official students' union of the University of Dhaka. It is better known in Bangladesh as DUCSU. It exists to represent Dhaka University students in the university's decision-making, to act as the voice for students in the national higher education policy debate, and to provide direct services to the student body. It was established in the academic year of 1922–23 as Dhaka University Student Union. Its first constitution was drafted in its general assembly on 30 October 1925. In 1953, its constitution was amended and the union was renamed Dhaka University Central Students' Union. In 2019, the last DUCSU election took place after 29 years. Since then DUCSU is working for the betterment of the students

Rankings

International rankings
In 2011–12, the University of Dhaka made it into the list of 'Top World Universities' by QS World University Rankings. Out of over 30,000 universities around the world, DU was placed at 551. In 2014–15, the University of Dhaka was ranked 701 by QS World University Rankings (formerly Times Higher Education–QS World University Rankings). In 2015–16, Times Higher Education partnering with Elsevier ranked the university at 654th position among top 800 globally reputed universities. In September 2015, QS World University Rankings published their 2015 edition of World University Rankings of 2015/16 and ranked DU at 126th position in Asia and 701–750 position in the world. In Times Higher Education 2018 Global University Ranking, University of Dhaka is placed in 1001+ position among the world universities.

Asian level rankings
In 2016–17, the University of Dhaka was ranked 109 by QS Asian University Rankings in Asia. Times Higher Education ranked the University of Dhaka at 191–200 position in 2016 Asia University ranking.

In the best Asian (and Australian) universities ranking, AsiaWeek ranked the University of Dhaka 37th in 1999 and 64th (overall and multi-disciplinary category) out of 77 ranked universities in 2000.

In 2000, the university got a comparatively higher rank in student selectivity (23rd) while got lower ranking in academic reputation (74th), faculty resources (59th), research (65th) and financial resources (74) categories.

According to the subject-wise ranking by the QS World University Rankings by Subject 2015 – English Language & Literature, only two South Asian universities, including the University of Dhaka (ranking 251–300), were found in the rankings.

Vice chancellor

 The first vice chancellor of the University of Dhaka was Sir Philip Hartog. There have been 28 vice chancellors in Dhaka University.
 The current vice chancellor is Mohammad Akhtaruzzaman.

Notable alumni and faculty members

Constituent colleges and institutions

References

External links

 Official website
 Dhaka University Admission Information

 
Universities and colleges in Dhaka
Public universities of Bangladesh
Educational institutions established in 1921
1921 establishments in British India
British colonial architecture in Bangladesh
Recipients of the Independence Day Award